Coelognathus flavolineatus, the black copper rat snake or yellow striped snake,  is a species of colubrid snake found in Southeast Asia. This species was previously recognized in the genus Elaphe.

Distribution
 Brunei Darussalam
 Cambodia
 India (Andaman Is.)
 Indonesia (Jawa, Kalimantan, Sumatera, Bali)
 Malaysia
 Myanmar
 Singapore
 Thailand
 Vietnam

References

Rat snakes
Reptiles of Thailand
Reptiles of Myanmar
Reptiles of Vietnam
Reptiles of Cambodia
Reptiles of Malaysia
Reptiles described in 1837
Snakes of Vietnam
Snakes of Asia
Reptiles of Borneo